Ondřej Buchtela (8 November 1999 – 24 July 2020) was a Czech professional ice hockey defenceman.

Buchtela made his professional debut for Piráti Chomutov during the 2016–17 Czech Extraliga season and played a total of 27 regular season games for the team over three seasons. During his career he had multiple loan spells in the 1st Czech Republic Hockey League with SK Trhači Kadaň, HC Stadion Litoměřice, HC Slovan Ústečtí Lvi and HC Benátky nad Jizerou. Buchtela played in the 2017 IIHF World U18 Championships for the Czech Republic.

Buchtela died on 24 July 2020 from heart cancer, aged 20.

References

External links

1999 births
2020 deaths
HC Benátky nad Jizerou players
Czech ice hockey defencemen
Deaths from cancer in the Czech Republic
Deaths from heart cancer
Place of death missing
Piráti Chomutov players
HC Slovan Ústečtí Lvi players
Sportovní Klub Kadaň players
Sportspeople from Ústí nad Labem
HC Stadion Litoměřice players